"What's That" is the second and final single by British band The Madness from their 1988 eponymous album. It was released in the UK only on 7" and 12" vinyl, and also as a 10" vinyl picture disc. It was the first release by Madness or any of its spin-off bands not to reach the top 75 in the UK. It peaked at No. 92 and lasted two weeks on the chart, dropping to No. 98 the following week after its debut.

Critical reception
Upon its release, Lesley O'Toole of Record Mirror considered "What's That" to be so different from its predecessor "I Pronounce You" that it "might as well be the work of a different collective entirely". She concluded, "Jaunty nursery rhyme scansion meets rumbustious techno-noises in a characteristically off the wall offering." Jerry Smith of Music Week noted, "The revitalised Madness are having a few problems regaining the hit trail with their new, more reflective sound, but this moody number is real grower and could set them right." Ian Gittins of Melody Maker was critical, describing it as "a boring stick of nothing" and Madness "scrap[ing] the barrel". He wrote, "They open up like Raw Sex, bouncing a finger off a Hammond organ, then kind of... stay there, refusing all options open to them."

Track listing
7"
"What's That" (Smyth) - 3:34
"Be Good Boy" (Thompson/Foreman) - 4:26

12"/CD
"What's That" (Smyth) - 3:34
"Be Good Boy" (Thompson/Foreman) - 4:26
"Flashings" (Smyth/McPherson) - 3:21

There were also two 5" interlocking vinyl picture discs issued; one featured "Be Good Boy" on the B-side, the other "Flashings".

References

1988 singles
1988 songs
Madness (band) songs
Virgin Records singles
Songs written by Chas Smash